Wa to Yo (Japanese: 和と洋, lit. Japanese and Western) is the eleventh studio album by Japanese-American singer-songwriter Ai. It was released on June 7, 2017 through EMI Records and Universal Music Group. It consists of two discs, the Wa disc recorded in Japanese while the Yo disc was recorded in English. The album features guest appearances and collaborations from Kodō, Jinmenusagi, Himekami, Jamaican musician Junior Reid, American singer-songwriter Eric Bellinger, and American singer-songwriter Chris Brown. Wa to Yo is primarily a J-pop, R&B, soul and hip hop album.

Two singles were released from Wa to Yo, "Justice Will Prevail at Last" and "Kira Kira" featuring Naomi Watanabe.

Background 
After the release of Moriagaro in 2013, Ai was engaged to Hiro, the leader and vocalist of the rock band Kaikigesshoku. The pair had been dating for 10 years, and wed in January 2014. In August 2015, Ai gave birth to her first child.

The album was first teased on Ai's YouTube channel on April 20, 2017.

Development 

Wanting to "convey the goodness of Japan" to the rest of the world and "the goodness of the overseas to Japanese people", Ai collaborated with several producers, artists and songwriters from both Japan and the west. The album combines traditional Japanese instruments with modern western genres.

In an interview with her label, Ai stated majority of the English songs from the Yo disc were recorded during her Atlantic City session, originally intended for her tenth studio album, Moriagaro.

Track listing 
All tracks written by Ai Uemura except where noted.

Deluxe edition

Notes 
 The deluxe reissue of Wa to Yo is titled Wa to Yo to.
 "Wonderful World" samples "Kamigami no Uta" by Himekami.
 Tracks 4, 7, 12, 15, and 16 are titled in Japanese.
 Tracks 5, 8, 9 and 11 of disc two are stylized in all upper case lettering.
 Tracks 4 and 7 of disc two are stylized in all upper case lettering.

Charts

Credits and personnel 
Credits adapted from album's liner notes.
 Ai Carina Uemura – lead vocals, songwriting, producer
 Uta – producer, songwriting
 Julian Le – producer, songwriting
 Gakushi – producer, songwriting
 Da Beatfreakz – producer
 Tha Gutbangaz – co–producer
 Taji Okuda – vocal editing
 Chris Brown – featured artist, songwriting
 Eric Bellinger – featured artist, songwriting
 Junior Reid – featured artist, songwriting
 Jinmenusagi – featured artist, songwriting
 Himekami – featured artist, sound production, songwriting
 Victoria Emily Hogan Marshal – songwriting
 Matthew "Damario" Quinney – songwriting
 Carlos "Los" Jenkins – songwriting
 Uche Ben Eble – songwriting
 Obi Fred Eble – songwriting
 Keisuke Fujimaki – vocal editing
 Yoshinori Morita – vocal editing
 Satoshi Yoneda – vocal editing
 Sayaka Ogoshi – vocal editing
 Tomoe Nishikawa – vocal editing
 Black the Beast – producer, vocal editing, mixing
 Don City – producer, vocal editor, mixing
 Neeraj Khajanchi – vocal editing 
 Hitoshi Sato – vocal editing
 D.O.I – mixing
 Tyrone Wright – songwriting
 Victoria Kimani – songwriting
 Issa – songwriting
 Derrick D. Beck – songwriting, producer
 Arin Ray – songwriting
 Vincent Berry – songwriting
 Joshua Berry – songwriting
 Jamal Gaines – songwriting
 Anthony Charles Williams II – songwriting
 Ty Steez – songwriting
 Vakseen – songwriting, producer
 Alex Geringas – songwriting, producer
 Samantha Nelson – songwriting
 Latisha Hyman – songwriting
 David Claxton – songwriting
 Lynne Hobday – songwriting
 Donameche Jackson – songwriting
 Seiichi Watanabe – A&R (EMI Records)
 Daisuke Fujikawa – marketing
 Yoko Tsunashima – marketing 
 Kimiko Kato – sales promotion (Universal)
 Kotaro Suzuki – media promotion
 Norio Eguchi – media promotion
 Mika Mitsumochi – media promotion
 Masayoshi Abe – media promotion
 Mitsuru Sekiya – media promotion
 Rie Deguchi – media promotion
 Sae Yamamoto – media promotion
 Takeshi Okada – digital & web promotion
 Sayaka Abe – digital & web promotion
 Yoshiaki Ando – digital & web promotion
 Mina Hosojima – digital & web promotion
 Runa Hayasaka – digital & web promotion
 Takeshi Okada – digital & web promotion
 Yuka Tsukada – digital production
 Yuka Sato – digital production
 Masao Eto – area promotion
 Shintaro Ishihara – area promotion
 Sayoko Okuno – legal
 Yukari Kuwahara – legal
 Aiichiro Kiyohara – UM & brands
 Nobuo Kobayashi – UM & brands
 Akihito Watanabe – master localization
 Taku Nakamura – project producer
 Naoshi Fujikura – supervisor
 Koichi Sakakibara – manager
 Yuki Arai – executive producer
 Kate Moross – art director
 Ina Jang – photographer
 Akemi Ono – makeup artist, hair artist
 Noriko Goto – stylist
 Risa Nakazawa – visual coordinator
 Shuma Saito – package coordinator
 Akio Kawabata – package coordinator
 Randy Merrill – mastering
 Tom Coyne – mastering

Release history

Notes

References 

2017 albums
Ai (singer) albums
Japanese-language albums
Universal Music Group albums
Universal Music Japan albums
EMI Records albums
Albums produced by Ai (singer)